The Anna Nicole Smith Story (working title: Anna Nicole: The Movie) is a 2007 biographical film depicting the life of Anna Nicole Smith.

The film was released by Nasser Entertainment Group and stars Willa Ford in the title role. The film's production was described as "fast track" by the film's producer, Joseph Nasser.

Cast
 Willa Ford as Anna Nicole Smith
 Patrick Ryan Anderson as Daniel Wayne Smith
 Christian Berney as Daniel Wayne Smith – Age 13
 Jake Short as Daniel Wayne Smith – Child
 Richard Herd as J. Howard Marshall
 Lesli Kay as Ginger
 Chris Devlin as Howard K. Stern
 Bobby Trendy as himself
 Lenny Hirsh as Larry Birkhead
 Eddie Velez as a Playboy Photographer

Production
Both Insider and Entertainment Tonight have paid special attention to the film's progress. On April 26, 2007, ET gave an exclusive sneak peek at the film, showing parts of both Daniel's and Anna's death scenes and exclusive interviews with the cast. The film was released on DVD on September 22, 2009.

References

External links

American biographical drama films
Biographical films about actors
Biographical films about models
Films set in the 1990s
Films set in the 2000s
Films about modeling
2000s English-language films
Films scored by Harry Manfredini
Cultural depictions of Anna Nicole Smith
Films directed by Keoni Waxman
2000s American films